Tithorea tarricina, the tarricina longwing, variable presonian, or cream-spotted tigerwing, is a species of butterfly belonging to the family Nymphalidae.

Description

The pattern of the wings is quite variable. Usually the dorsal sides of the forewings are black with white spots, while the hindwings are orange with black margins. The underside are similar, with many small white spots along the black margins. The antennae are black. The beautiful chrysalides are completely golden.

Distribution
This rare species is present in Mexico and in Central and South America.

Habitat
The host plants are in the genus Prestonia (mainly P. longifolia and P. portabellensis – family Apocynaceae).

Subspecies
The following subspecies are recognised:
T. t. bonita Haensch, 1903 (Ecuador, Peru)
T. t. duenna Bates, 1864 (Mexico to Guatemala)
T. t. franciscoi Brown, 1977 (Venezuela)
T. t. hecalesina C. & R. Felder, 1865 (Colombia)
T. t. lecromi Vitale & Rodriguez, 2004 (Colombia)
T. t. parola Godman & Salvin, 1898 (Colombia)
T. t. pinthias Godman & Salvin, 1878 (Panama, Costa Rica, Nicaragua)
T. t. tagarma Hewitson, 1874 (Bolivia, Peru)
T. t. tarricina Hewitson, 1858 (Colombia)

References

 BioLib
 Cambridge Butterfly Conservatory
 Monteverde Butterflies

External links
 Neotropical Butterflies
 Butterflies of America
 Remain Gardens

Ithomiini
Nymphalidae of South America
Butterflies described in 1858